The U.S. state of New York has generally been seen as socially liberal in regard to lesbian, gay, bisexual, and transgender (LGBT) rights. LGBT travel guide Queer in the World states,  "The fabulosity of Gay New York is unrivaled on Earth, and queer culture seeps into every corner of its five boroughs". The advocacy movement for LGBT rights in the state has been dated as far back as 1969 during the Stonewall riots in New York City. Same-sex sexual activity between consenting adults has been legal since the New York v. Onofre case in 1980. Same-sex marriage has been legal statewide since 2011, with some cities recognizing domestic partnerships between same-sex couples since 1998. Discrimination protections in credit, housing, employment, education, and public accommodation have explicitly included sexual orientation since 2003 and gender identity or expression since 2019. Transgender people in the state legally do not have to undergo sex reassignment surgery to change their sex or gender on official documents since 2014. In addition, both conversion therapy on minors and the gay and trans panic defense have been banned since 2019. Since 2021, commercial surrogacy has been legally available within New York State.

On June 28, 1969, LGBT people rioted following a police raid on the Stonewall Inn. The Stonewall riots and further protests over the following nights were a watershed moment in the history of LGBT rights, and the beginning of the modern LGBT rights movement. New York City is now regarded as one of the most LGBT-friendly cities in the world. At Stonewall 50 – WorldPride NYC 2019, tens of thousands of people marched in the NYC Pride March, with about 5 million people in attendance, constituting the world’s largest LGBT event in history. In April 2022 following the enactment of the Florida Parental Rights in Education Act, New York City Mayor Eric Adams announced a digital billboard campaign to attract Floridians
to a significantly more supportive environment for LGBTQ+ residents in New York City.

Recognition of same-sex relationships

Legality of same-sex sexual activity
All existing laws against private consenting homosexual sexual conduct between adults were abolished by the New York Court of Appeals in the 1980 case New York v. Onofre, with the exception of laws affecting employees of the New York National Guard. A law repealing the sodomy provisions took effect in 2000.

Adultery is a criminal offense in New York, and applies equally to all married couples (including within a same-sex marriage).

In November 2019, Governor Andrew Cuomo signed a bill into law granting military service members who received dishonorable discharges, under the federal Don't ask, don't tell policy from 1993 to 2011, access to state veterans’ benefits.

Same sex marriage

On June 24, 2011, the New York State Legislature passed and the Governor signed the Marriage Equality Act allowing same-sex marriages to be performed in New York State. The law took effect on July 24, 2011.

Previously, New York had recognized same-sex marriages performed in other jurisdictions since May 14, 2008, when Governor David Paterson issued an executive directive for all state agencies to recognize such marriages. New York City has recognized domestic partnerships since 1998, when Mayor Rudy Giuliani signed a law establishing them.

Before the passage of the Marriage Equality Act, the New York Court of Appeals held that New York law did not permit same-sex marriage and that there was no state constitutional right to same-sex marriage.

New York has provided benefits to same-sex partners of state employees since 1995.

Adoption and parenting
New York law allows LGBT individuals and same-sex couples to petition to adopt. Multiples centers and organizations help same-sex couples with the adoption and fostering process.

In 1982, New York became the first state to create a policy of non-discrimination in adoption for individual gay and lesbian applicants, which stated, “Applicants shall not be rejected solely on the basis of homosexuality.” However, social workers and agencies could still weigh sexual orientation as a factor. In 1995, the court ruling in the ‘In The Matter of Jacob’ case allowed for second-parent adoptions. In 2004, the court in ‘In The Matter of Carolyn B.’ ruled in favor of joint adoption for same-sex couples.

In vitro fertilization (IVF) is available to lesbian couples in the state, however, surrogacy of any kind has been explicitly a criminal offence by fines and jail time between 1992 and 2020. Since April 2020, passed and signed (within the New York State Government Budget bill), surrogacy was legalized by the New York State Legislature and the Governor of New York State. The law went into effect on February 15, 2021.

In October 2020, a court order within New York legally allowed religious groups and organizations to discriminate against gay, single and unmarried heterosexual couples in adopting children - due to a "religious affiliation and beliefs" under the US First Amendment and Fourteenth Amendment.

In February 2021, it was announced by Governor Andrew Cuomo that insurance policy coverage must cover same-sex couples for IVF, surrogacy and/or other fertility treatments.

2022 New York City IVF Lawsuit
In April 2022, a male same-sex couple within New York City commenced a lawsuit against their health insurance - to explicitly include IVF treatment costs and coverage for all individuals and couples, regardless of sexual orientation and gender. Currently within New York City health insurance providers provides only heterosexual and female same-sex couples are costs covered and reimbursed - but not for male gay couples who have to pay the "full pocket cost amounts" with no coverage and reimbursement whatsoever, amounting to an indirect "gay tax".

Discrimination protections
In 2003, New York's Sexual Orientation Non-Discrimination Act (SONDA) took effect. SONDA "prohibits discrimination on the basis of actual or perceived sexual orientation in employment, housing, public accommodations, education, credit, and the exercise of civil rights." The 2003 law also explicitly includes "asexuality", a first for the United States.

Originally, the law did not include gender identity. On December 16, 2009, Governor David Paterson issued an executive order banning discrimination based on gender identity in state employment. Courts have also ruled that transgender individuals can pursue anti-discrimination claims under the category of "sex". Beginning in 2007, the New York State Assembly passed the Gender Expression Non-Discrimination Act (GENDA) ten times. The bill would add gender identity to the state's anti-discrimination laws. Each time it reached the State Senate, however, the bill died in that body's Judiciary Committee. A recent instance of such a defeat was April 25, 2017, when five Republicans and one Democrat on the N.Y. Senate Investigations and Government Operations Committee voted against it. On May 5, 2018, it was voted down by the same committee (5 Republicans against, 4 Democrats in favor). In January 2019, however, the Committee on Investigations and Government Operations voted in favor of the gender identity discrimination bill by a 6–0 vote, and both the State Assembly and the State Senate passed it by votes of 100-40 and 42–19, respectively. The same month, Governor Andrew Cuomo signed the bill into law. The law went into effect on February 24, 2019, as per the New York Constitution.

Previously, in the absence of a statewide law, the counties of Suffolk, Tompkins, and Westchester, along with the cities of New York, Albany, Binghamton, Buffalo, Ithaca, Syracuse and Rochester passed non-discrimination ordinances protecting gender identity. In addition, on October 22, 2015, Governor Andrew Cuomo announced that he would direct the New York State Division of Human Rights (DHR) to promulgate regulations banning harassment and discrimination against transgender individuals in employment, housing, education, access to credit, and public accommodations. The DHR issued the regulations on November 4, 2015, and they went into effect on January 20, 2016.

Moreover, the state's anti-bullying law prohibits bullying on the basis of race, color, weight, national origin, ethnic group, religion or religious practice, disability, sexual orientation, gender (includes gender identity and expression) or sex. The law also explicitly includes cyberbullying and harassment, and applies to all public elementary and secondary schools in the state. On July 31, 2019, a new law implemented removed a loophole that did not legally protect students on discrimination, human rights and bullying within New York State.

Gay and trans panic defense
In June 2019, the New York State Legislature passed a bill to repeal the common law gay and transgender panic defense. The bill was signed into law by Governor Andrew Cuomo, effective immediately. New York State became the 6th US state to abolish it.

Hate crime law
The Hate Crimes Act of 2000 has covered sexual orientation since July 1, 2001, and gender identity and expression since November 1, 2019. In November 2022, New York Governor Kathy Hochul signed a pair of anti-bias bills - to reform comprehensive hate crime legislation and repeal loopholes. This is believed to be the toughest hate crime legislation ever passed within the United States.

LGBT seniors benefits and recognition
In October 2022, a bill was signed into law that would legally recognise LGBT seniors within New York State, and provide benefits.

Plastic surgery hospital case
In August 2020, it was reported by Gay City News that doctors were fined tens of thousands of dollars by a New York Manhattan court judge - due to blatenly illegally discriminated against both HIV-positive and gay men, who were patients of several hospitals within Manhattan were grossly denied healthcare in New York City. This court case could potentially be appealed.

Gender identity and expression
In March 2020, the attorney general of New York, Letitia James, changed the birth certificate policy to include individuals born within New York State to change sex or gender by just "self affirmation" - effective immediately. The prior policy required natural-born New Yorkers to be 18 or older to apply to change the gender designation on their birth certificates. They also had to submit a notarized affidavit from a medical expert verifying gender confirmation surgery or a diagnosis of gender dysphoria. This policy was announced partly because a 14-year-old sued New York State in January 2020 over his birth certificate that was issued by the state and which listed him as female.

In June 2021, legislation was passed, signed and implemented to both protect and make legally-binding these gender or sex change regulations formally official within New York State on drivers licences, IDs and birth certificates.

In April 2022, Kathy Hochul signed a Budget Bill that passed the New York Legislature into law that legally allows any individuals or spouses with marriage certificates available gender changes corrected - so that individuals or spouses (who got married in New York itself) can have by "open access self determination" to accurate and consistent vital marriage records within New York. Birth and death vital records of individuals are already legally available and implemented to have gender changes corrected recognised by "open access self determination" within New York.

Third Gender options on documents
In September 2018, the New York City Council passed by a vote of 41–6 an ordinance to allow a third gender option, "X", on birth certificates. Mayor Bill De Blasio had already come out in support of the bill, saying in a statement that the legislation will "allow transgender and gender nonconforming New Yorkers to live with the dignity and respect they deserve." He signed the ordinance into law on October 10, 2018, and it went into effect on January 1, 2019. From January 2, 2020, New York City has also included the "gender X" option on death certificates.

In November 2019, it was reported that court and jury documents will contain a "gender X" option, alongside male and female. In August 2020, New York State healthcare data includes a gender X option, alongside male and female.

As of December 2019, a New York government agency, the Office of Temporary and Disability Assistance, is being sued because it does not allow a "gender X" option alongside male and female. As of March 2020, there has been no update on this matter.

As of April 2020, New York State does not issue optional gender X driver's license yet - despite being completely surrounded by US states, that already have a gender X option available on drivers licenses. In July 2020, New York State is being sued in federal court by a 25 year old individual - due to only male or female options and no gender X or non-binary options being available on drivers licences and I.D.s issued within New York State. It was reported in November 2020, that within New York State from late-2021 drivers licences will include gender X when changes are made to computers at the DMV. It was formally announced and policy issued by the New York Governor in April 2022, that gender X must be available and recognised (alongside male and female) on all "New York State government issued" documents and forms - for both the departments of labor and disability by either 2023 or 2024 at the latest by regulations. Birth certificates and drivers licences both issued within New York State already have the gender X option implemented, that is available and recognised.

Gender pronouns utilities law
In November 2021, the governor of New York, Kathy Hochul, signed a bill into law requiring utility companies (e.g. water, electricity, gas, telecommunications, etc) to immediately update and/or correct information regarding gender pronouns for individual customers within New York State. This is believed to be the first law of its kind within the United States. The law went into effect on January 1, 2022.

Walking while trans law
In 1976, New York State implemented an anti-prostitution law (also colloquially known as the "walking while trans law" or penal law section 240.37). In February 2021, the New York State Legislature (New York Senate vote 45-16 and New York House of Representatives vote 105-44) passed a bill to repeal the "walking while trans" law. New York State Governor Andrew Cuomo signed it into law - effective immediately. The archaic loitering law, Section 240.37 of the New York State Penal Code, has been used by police officers to harass and arrest transgender individuals since 1976.

New York City intersex education
In April 2021, the New York City Council passed a bill 45-2, to implement education programs about intersex individuals. With the backing of NYC intersex advocates, the city plans to provide educational resources on the medical procedures imposed on intersex youth in an effort to fit their anatomy into the male and female binary.

Gender-neutral bathrooms
In November 2020, a bill – passed the New York State Legislature and then signed into law by New York Governor Andrew Cuomo a month later – implemented gender-neutral bathrooms within New York State. The bathroom law within New York State went into effect on March 23, 2021 (90 days after the New York governor's signature).

Conversion therapy

Beginning in 2003, bills pertaining to conversion therapy had passed the state Assembly 11 times. State senator Brad Hoylman, the only gay member of the senate and Assemblywoman Deborah J. Glick, New York's first openly gay legislator, introduced a bill to ban the practice in 2013. The bill passed the Assembly but died in the Senate. Hoylman attempted to pass the bill again for years but was repeatedly turned down in the Senate.

On June 16, 2014, the New York State Assembly voted 86–28 to pass a bill that would have prohibited health care providers from attempting to change the sexual orientation and/or gender identity of minors. However, the bill subsequently got blocked in the New York State Senate. In April 2015, the Assembly voted 111–12 to pass a bipartisan bill banning the practice and in April 2018 passed it again 116-19. Both times it died without a vote in the senate.

On February 6, 2016, New York Governor Andrew Cuomo announced regulations that ban public and private healthcare insurers from covering the practice and prohibit mental health facilities across the state from performing it. The regulations went into effect on April 27. The Human Rights Campaign celebrated this as the first time a governor had banned the practice using an executive action. 

On January 15, 2019, Bill A576, which banned the practice of conversion therapy on minors, passed the state Assembly by a vote of 141–7 and the state Senate 57–4. The bill was signed into law by Governor Andrew Cuomo and took effect on January 25, 2019.

Local bans
Prior to statewide prohibition, the following jurisdictions had enacted conversion therapy bans:

 Albany
 Albany County
 Erie County
 New York City (now repealed)
 Rochester
 Ulster County
 Westchester County

Living conditions

New York has one of the largest LGBT populations in the United States, and the world. Brian Silverman, the author of Frommer's New York City from $90 a Day, wrote that New York City has "one of the world's largest, loudest, and most powerful LGBT communities", and "gay and lesbian culture is as much a part of New York's basic identity as yellow cabs, high-rises, and Broadway theater". As of 2005, New York City was home to an estimated 272,493 self-identifying gay and bisexual individuals. The New York City metropolitan area had an estimated 568,903 self-identifying LGB residents. Meanwhile, New York City is also home to the largest transgender population in the United States, estimated at 50,000 in 2018, concentrated in Manhattan and Queens. Albany, the state capital, is also home to a large LGBT population, as are the cities of Buffalo, Rochester, Yonkers and Syracuse. Each host a variety of LGBT events, bars, cafés, organizations and centers. Fire Island Pines and Cherry Grove are famous internationally as gay holiday resorts with a thriving LGBT scene.

New York State possesses a long history of presence of LGBT people, and has generally been seen as socially liberal in regard to LGBT rights. However, New York also has an older history of LGBT individuals often being convicted in the state. Sexual relations between persons of the same gender (variously described as "sodomy", "buggery" or "sins of carnal nature") were illegal for most of the history of New York from its establishment as a Dutch colony onwards, until such relations were legalized by judicial action in 1980. Activism for the rights of LGBT people in the state began with the rise of protest actions by the first "homophile" organizations in the 1950s and 1960s, although LGBT activism was propelled into a watershed moment in the 1969 Stonewall riots in Lower Manhattan and the later protests against the apathy of civil and political institutions to the HIV/AIDS crisis. Various organizations were established for LGBT people to advocate for rights and provide human services, the impact of which was increasingly felt at the state level. Over the following years, LGBT people gained more and more visibility, and discussions surrounding LGBT rights became increasingly more prominent and mainstream. In 1980, the New York Supreme Court legalized private consensual same-sex sexual activity, a historic and landmark decision. Simultaneously with legal reforms ongoing in the state, societal and public attitudes toward the LGBT community also evolved, going from general antipathy and hostility to tolerance and acceptance. In the early 21st century, anti-discrimination laws were modified to cover sexual orientation (in 2003) and gender identity (in 2019), a conversion therapy ban was enacted, gender transition laws were relaxed (removing the requirement for surgery amongst others), and hate crime legislation was passed. In 2011, the New York State Legislature passed the Marriage Equality Act, legalizing same-sex marriage in the state. New York became the sixth state in the US to legalize it, after Massachusetts, Connecticut, Iowa, Vermont, and New Hampshire.

In June 2019, in celebration of LGBT Pride Month, Governor Andrew Cuomo ordered that the LGBT pride flag be raised over the New York State Capitol for the first time in New York history. The New York Police Department also apologised for the 1969 Stonewall riots, exactly 50 years later.

LGBT business city agreements
In January 2021, it was announced and reported that New York City recognises LGBT-owned businesses access to city contract agreements - very similar arrangements in California and some cities within New Jersey exist by legislation or executive order.

Defamation
On May 30, 2012, in the case of Yonaty v. Mincolla, a unanimous four-judge panel of the New York Appellate Division held that labeling someone "gay" or a "homosexual" can no longer be grounds for defamation. Justice Thomas Mercure wrote: "In light of the tremendous evolution in social attitudes regarding homosexuality...it cannot be said that current public opinion supports a rule that would equate statements imputing homosexuality with accusations of serious criminal conduct or insinuations that an individual has a loathsome disease."

Staten Island St Patrick's Day LGBT marching ban
In February 2022, it was reported that Staten Island St Patrick's Day parade still legally bans LGBT individuals from marching. New York City repealed the ban in 2014.

Judges and justice systems annual statistics
In November 2020, a bill was signed into law by New York State Governor Andrew Cuomo that legally requires annual statistics on judges in courtrooms and New York State justice systems - based on gender, gender identity, sexual orientation, religion, race, color, disability, etc.

Public opinion
A 2017 Public Religion Research Institute poll found that 69% of New York residents supported same-sex marriage, while 24% were opposed and 7% were unsure. Additionally, 75% supported discrimination protections covering sexual orientation and gender identity. 19% were opposed.

Summary table

See also

 Empire State Pride Agenda
 Law of New York
 LGBT culture in New York City
 LGBT history in New York
 List of self-identified LGBTQ New Yorkers
 New York Human Rights Law
 Same-sex marriage in New York
 Stonewall riots

References